Sciblogs.co.nz is a network of New Zealand based science bloggers. The network was founded in late 2009 and includes a collection of scientists from universities, Crown Research Institutes and private research organisations.

Sciblogs.co.nz was established in September 2009 by the Science Media Centre (NZ) funded by the Ministry of Research, Science & Technology (MoRST) through the Royal Society of New Zealand. It is based on the WordPress platform. Around half of the blogs are syndicated from existing science bloggers, the rest are hosted exclusively on Sciblogs. Sciblogs content is syndicated on Google News and Scoop.co.nz as well as on Facebook and Twitter.

The site is one of the largest blog networks in New Zealand.

In August 2015, Sciblogs was redeveloped and relaunched with a more visual appearance and improved functionality, as well as the addition of new bloggers covering everything from psychology to drones.

References

External links
 sciblogs.co.nz

New Zealand science websites
 Sciblogs.co.nz
Internet properties established in 2009